The 2002 Florida Commissioner of Agriculture election took place on November 5, 2002, to elect the Florida Commissioner of Agriculture. Charles H. Bronson won and was in office from May 14, 2001 to January 4, 2011.

Charles H. Bronson served under two governors, Jeb Bush And Charlie Crist.

Candidates

Republican 

 Charles H. Bronson

Democratic 

 David Nelson

General Election

References 

Florida Commissioner of Agriculture elections
Commissioner of Agriculture
Florida Commissioner of Agriculture